Paardekraal may refer to:

 Paardekraal suburb of Rustenburg
 Paardekraal, former name of Krugersdorp
 Paardekraal Monument (built 1890) in Krugersdorp